Tanghekou Town, is a town in the northern side of Huairou District, Beijing, China. It shares border with Labagoumen and Changshaoying Manchu Ethnic Townships to the northeast, Shicheng and Liulimiao Towns to the south, and Baoshan Town to the southwest. In 2020 it had a total population of 5,445. Its name Tanghekou literally means "North House".

The town is situated inside a river valley, around the confluence of Bai River and Tang River. For this reason it receives its name Tanghekou.

History

Administrative divisions 
As of the time in writing, there are 23 subdivisions within Tanghekou Town, where 1 of them is a community and all the rest are villages:

Gallery

See also 

 List of township-level divisions of Beijing

References 

Huairou District
Towns in Beijing